League Park, and variations on that name, used as the name of a Major League Baseball park, was a designation frequently applied in the late 19th century to early 20th century to distinguish a professional team's stadium from a public park or other recreational venue. As such, the term may refer to any one of these former baseball parks:

League Park (Akron) in Akron, Ohio
League Park in Cleveland, Ohio; the most enduring of the various "League Parks"
League Park (Cincinnati) in Ohio
League Park (Houston) in Texas
League Park (Toledo) in Ohio
League Park (San Antonio) in Texas
League Park in St. Louis, Missouri, better known as Robison Field
American League Park, better known as Hilltop Park, in New York City
American League Park in Washington, D.C.
National League Park in Cleveland, Ohio
National League Park in Philadelphia, Pennsylvania, better known as Baker Bowl
League Park, in Springfield, Massachusetts, also known as Pynchon Park
Bain Field, Norfolk, Virginia; formerly League Park (1917–1930)
League Park in Fort Wayne, Indiana